Irek (İrek) is a rural locality (a village) in Tuzlukushevsky Selsoviet, Belebeyevsky District, Bashkortostan, Russia. The population was 86 as of 2010. There are 3 streets.

Geography 
Irek is located 20 km north of Belebey (the district's administrative centre) by road. Akkain is the nearest rural locality.

References 

Rural localities in Belebeyevsky District